The 2021 Pacific typhoon season was the second consecutive to have below-average tropical cyclone activity, with twenty-two named storms, and was the least active since 2011. Nine became typhoons, and five of those intensified into super typhoons. This low activity was caused by a strong La Niña that had persisted from the previous year. The season's first named storm, Dujuan, developed on February 16, while the last named storm, Rai, dissipated on December 21. The season's first typhoon, Surigae, reached typhoon status on April 16. It became the first super typhoon of the year on the next day, also becoming the strongest tropical cyclone in 2021. Surigae was also the most powerful tropical cyclone on record in the Northern Hemisphere for the month of April. Typhoons In-fa and Rai are responsible for more than half of the total damage this season, adding up to a combined total of $2.02 billion.

The scope of this article is limited to the Pacific Ocean to the north of the equator between 100°E and 180th meridian. Within the northwestern Pacific Ocean, there are two separate agencies that assign names to tropical cyclones, which can often result in a cyclone having two names. The Japan Meteorological Agency (JMA) names a tropical cyclone should it be judged to have 10-minute sustained wind speeds of at least 65 km/h (40 mph) anywhere in the basin, whilst the Philippine Atmospheric, Geophysical and Astronomical Services Administration (PAGASA) assigns names to tropical cyclones which move into or form as a tropical depression in their area of responsibility located between 135°E and 115°E and between 5°N and 25°N, regardless of whether or not a tropical cyclone has already been given a name by the JMA. Tropical depressions that are monitored by the United States' Joint Typhoon Warning Center (JTWC) are given a number with a "W" suffix.


Seasonal forecasts

During the year, several national meteorological services and scientific agencies forecast how many tropical cyclones, tropical storms, and typhoons will form during a season and/or how many tropical cyclones will affect a particular country. These agencies included the Tropical Storm Risk (TSR) Consortium of University College London, PAGASA and Taiwan's Central Weather Bureau. The first forecast was released by PAGASA on December 27, 2020, in their monthly seasonal climate outlook predicting the first half of 2021. The PAGASA predicts that only 0–3 tropical cyclones are expected to form or enter the Philippine Area of Responsibility between January and March, while 1–4 tropical cyclones are expected to form between April and June. PAGASA also predicted that the ongoing La Niña could persist until the end of the first quarter of 2021. Tropical Storm Risk (TSR) issued their first extended range forecast on May 11, predicting a slightly below-average season with 24 tropical storms, 15 typhoons and 9 intense typhoons.

On June 23, the PAGASA released their monthly climate outlook for the rest of 2021, predicting 5 to 9 tropical cyclones developing or entering their area of responsibility from July to September, and 5 to 8 tropical cyclones from October to December. TSR issued an update to their forecast on July 7, reiterating their expectations for slightly below-average activity. On August 9, TSR issued their final forecast for the season, slightly lowering their numbers to 25 named storms, 13 typhoons and 7 intense typhoons.

Seasonal summary 

The season began in January with a weak and short-lived tropical depression that brought damages to the Philippines. In mid-February, another tropical depression formed, before being assigned the local name Auring by the PAGASA. The system then strengthened into a tropical storm, being given the name Dujuan by the JMA, making it the first named storm of the year. Another tropical depression formed in March, though it was short-lived, dissipating shortly after forming. On April 12, a tropical depression formed to the south of Woleai. It strengthened into a tropical storm, being given the name Surigae by the JMA. On April 15, it was further upgraded into a severe tropical storm, before being upgraded to a typhoon on the next day, and to a super typhoon on April 17, making it the first of the season and the strongest recorded cyclone to form in the month of April in the Northern Hemisphere, however, it did not hit any landmasses. Then, in mid-May a new tropical depression was named Crising by the PAGASA and made landfall on Baganga, Davao Oriental as a weak tropical storm, bringing minimal damages due to its small size. Two tropical depressions formed on May 29 and 30 respectively, with the first being assigned the local name Dante by the PAGASA. Dante intensified into a tropical storm, being assigned the name Choi-wan, before moving over the Philippines and making landfall eight times, bringing widespread damages to the country. A tropical depression formed behind Choi-wan on May 30; it didn't develop further.

The second typhoon of the season, Champi, briefly threatened the Ogasawara Islands before recurving through the main Japanese islands. Another depression formed at the end of June; it stayed from any landmasses while two tropical depressions formed in early July with both of them affecting land. One of them was named Emong by PAGASA. In mid-July, In-fa formed and became the third typhoon of the season. The storm contributed to rainfall and flooding in eastern China as it made landfall near Shanghai. Meanwhile, tropical storm Cempaka affected southern China and northern Vietnam. Another tropical storm, Nepartak, formed as Cempaka made landfall. Nepartak affected Japan in late July, disrupting the 2020 Summer Olympics, before becoming extratropical in the sea of Japan. By the end of July, activity abruptly exploded as eight tropical depressions formed within a week. Half of them were short-lived and dissipated without becoming tropical storms. Another depression and the remaining three were named Lupit, Nida, and Mirinae. Lupit and Mirinae both threatened Japan while Nida stayed out to sea. A system from the Central Pacific traveled a long distance and became Tropical Storm Omais over the Philippine Sea.

After Omais, the tropics stayed quiet for the rest of August until early September, when Conson rapidly intensified to become a typhoon in less than 24 hours before hitting the Philippines and Chanthu becoming the second Category 5-equivalent super typhoon of the season. After Chanthu dissipated, there was a pause in activity until Typhoon Mindulle and Tropical storm Dianmu formed. Dianmu soon made landfall on Vietnam and dissipated, but Mindulle went on to become the third Category 5-equivalent super typhoon of the season. Soon thereafter in the month of October, four storm named Lionrock, Kompasu, Namtheun, and Malou formed. Lionrock made landfall over Vietnam, causing agricultural damage. Kompasu made landfall in the Philippines and later China, causing severe flooding, infrastructure, and agricultural damage. Tropical Depression Nando also formed in early October but was absorbed by Kompasu. Namtheun initially peaked as a minimal tropical storm while being highly sheared, but unexpectedly conditions became briefly more favorable and peaked as a minimal typhoon. The system transitioned into an extratropical low before explosively intensifying into a bomb cyclone and impacting the Pacific Northwest. In late October, Malou peaked as a Category 2-equivalent typhoon, and only impacted the Bonin Islands. In the South China Sea, tropical depression 26W formed before making landfall in southern Vietnam and causing torrential flooding. After an unusual four-week break of inactivity, Nyatoh formed on November 29 and later strengthened to a typhoon on December 1. It later turned towards the northeast, became a super typhoon then transitioned into an extratropical cyclone.

After Nyatoh, in the early week of December, a disturbance formed east of the Philippines and moved eastward, while dumping rains on parts of Visayas and Mindanao. After that, it merged with another invest (designated 96W by the Joint Typhoon Warning Center) and headed towards the west-northwest. It later strengthened to a tropical depression by December 12, with the JTWC later designating it as 28W. 9 hours later, 28W intensified to Tropical Storm Rai, meaning Yapese stone money. Rai continued intensifying as it headed west and passed south of Ngulu State, and intensified into a severe tropical storm by 14 December. It got battered by wind shear as it neared the small island country of Palau, and by evening, entered the Philippine Area of Responsibility and was given the local name of Odette. Four hours later, Rai (Odette) began showing an eye feature first seen in microwave imaging, with Rai later becoming a Category 1-equivalent typhoon. Steady intensification ensued, and Rai later reached Category 2-equivalent status. By the evening of December 15, Typhoon Rai underwent unexpected rapid intensification, doubling its wind speeds from a 120 km/h (75 mph) to 260 km/h (160 mph)—Category 5-equivalent winds—by December 16, effectively making it a super typhoon. Rai then began an eyewall replacement cycle shortly after reaching its first peak intensity, weakening below Category 5-equivalent status. It made landfall in General Luna, Surigao del Norte as a 155 mph Category 4-equivalent storm. It made 8 more landfalls, weakening to a Category 2-equivalent typhoon by the time it entered the Sulu Sea. Rai then began to re-intensify, making its 10th landfall in Roxas, Palawan. After this, Rai continued re-intensification, becoming a Category 5-equivalent typhoon once again in the South China Sea, the first in the month of December and the third to do so after Typhoon Pamela (1954) and Typhoon Rammasun. After this, Rai began weakening, eventually dissipating west of the Batanes in December 21. A tropical depression, designated 29W by JTWC, formed in December 14 and affected Malaysia with widespread flooding, and struck around the same time as Rai was pounding through the Visayas. 29W dissipated by December 17, as Rai entered the Sulu Sea.

Rai contributed to the change of PAGASA's Tropical Cyclone Wind Signals and TC classification, which itself was deemed as a super typhoon by the agency when the change was made in March 23, 2022.

Systems

Tropical Storm Dujuan (Auring)

At 06:00 UTC on February 16, the JMA reported that a tropical depression had formed. Eight hours later, the JTWC issued a Tropical Cyclone Formation Alert (TCFA) for the system. By February 17, the system moved into the Philippine Area of Responsibility (PAR), being assigned the local name Auring from the PAGASA. At 06:00 UTC on the same day, the JTWC upgraded the system to a tropical depression, giving it the designation 01W. On February 18, as it neared the Philippines, the JMA, JTWC, and the PAGASA upgraded the system to a tropical storm. with the JMA assigning it the name Dujuan. The PAGASA later upgraded Dujuan to a severe tropical storm; however, this only lasted for six hours. On February 20, the storm significantly weakened due to high vertical wind shear, prompting the JTWC to downgrade the system back to a tropical depression. By February 22, all agencies had downgraded the system to a tropical depression after the system's center had weakened prior to making landfall. The JMA and the JTWC issued their final advisories moments after. The storm made landfall over Batag Island in Laoang, Northern Samar at 09:00 PHT (01:00 UTC) on February 22, dissipating thereafter.

Dujuan briefly moved over Palau on February 16 as a tropical depression, bringing heavy rainfall to parts of the country. In anticipation of the storm, the PAGASA raised Signal #1 warnings for the eastern section of Mindanao and on the eastern provinces of Visayas on February 19. Signal 2 warnings were also issued for the majority of Samar Island, Southern Leyte, the Dinagat Islands, and Surigao del Norte on February 21, prior to its landfall. Classes and government work were suspended on February 22 in parts of Eastern Visayas and Central Visayas, including Surigao del Sur. A total of 242,194 individuals were affected in Northern Mindanao, Caraga, and in the Davao Region. At least 77,811 of the affected individuals were taken to 344 various evacuation shelters in each region. One person was reported dead with four others reported missing, with total damages to agriculture and infrastructure amounting to ₱159.8 million (US$3.29 million).

Typhoon Surigae (Bising)

A low-pressure area south of Woleai developed into a tropical depression on April 12. A few hours later, the JTWC issued a TCFA for the developing storm, with the PAGASA beginning to issue advisories for the tropical depression as it remained outside of the PAR. On April 13, the JTWC upgraded the system to a tropical depression and assigned it the designation 02W. At 18:00 UTC, the JMA upgraded the cyclone to a tropical storm and named it Surigae. On April 15 at 00:00 UTC, the JMA upgraded Surigae to a severe tropical storm as an eye began forming. Later that day, the JTWC upgraded the storm to a typhoon, making it the first of the season. Surigae then entered the PAGASA's Philippine Area of Responsibility, getting the local name Bising. The JMA followed suit early on the next day as a central dense overcast developed and filled the original eye. Surigae continued to rapidly intensify, and on April 16, the JTWC upgraded Surigae to a Category 2-equivalent typhoon on the SSHWS. The system continued its rapid intensification until it reached Category 5-equivalent super typhoon status, becoming the most intense typhoon ever recorded in the month of April. After attaining peak intensity, signs of a concentric eyewall indicated that the storm was undergoing an eyewall replacement cycle, with the central dense overcast starting to warm and the eye becoming cloud-filled. On April 19, following its eyewall replacement cycle, Surigae became annular. A few days later, on April 22, Surigae began to weaken again, with the storm's structure deteriorating and its large eye dissipating. Soon afterward, all of the remaining convection was sheared to the east as the storm moved over cooler waters. As most of the remaining thunderstorms had dissipated, the JTWC assessed that Surigae transitioned into a subtropical cyclone on April 23. Late on April 24, the JTWC issued their final advisory on the system as it was nearing the completion of its extratropical transition. A few hours later, the JMA declared that Surigae had become extratropical.

After being named, tropical storm watches and warnings were issued for Yap in the Federated States of Micronesia, as well as for Koror and Kayangel in Palau on April 14. Warnings were eventually issued for Ngulu Atoll as well. Winds of up to 30 mph (50 km/h) were recorded in Yap on that day as Surigae passed from the southwest. Damage in Palau was estimated at US$4.8 million. On April 16, as the storm tracked towards the Philippines, the PAGASA issued Signal #1 warnings for areas around the country, also issuing Signal #2 warnings the next day for Catanduanes and Samar. Very strong winds and heavy rains affected the eastern part of the Philippines, with storm surge inundating parts of coastline nearest to the typhoon. Surigae killed a total of 8 people and left another 10 missing. The storm also caused at least ₱272.55 million (US$5.65 million) in damages.

Tropical Depression 03W (Crising)

The JTWC issued a TCFA for the convection on May 12, as it further developed in an environment with low vertical wind shear and warm sea surface temperatures. Just three hours later, the agency recognised that the area of convection had quickly consolidated into a tropical depression and assigned it with the identifier of 03W. Around the same time, the JMA had also recognised the storm as a tropical depression while it was to the east of Mindanao. Since the storm developed within the Philippine Area of Responsibility, the PAGASA immediately named the storm Crising once the agency recognized it as a tropical depression as well, and later raised Signal No. 2 warnings for areas in Mindanao. In the early hours of May 13, the JTWC upgraded the system into a tropical storm, with the PAGASA following suit hours later. Later that day, Crising's low-level circulation center became exposed due to wind shear, and it lost organization. At 8:20 p.m. Philippine Standard Time (12:20 UTC), Crising made landfall in Baganga, Davao Oriental as a weakening tropical storm. It quickly degraded as soon as it made landfall, with both the JTWC and the PAGASA downgrading it to a tropical depression at 15:00 UTC. At 03:00 UTC on that day, the PAGASA reported that the system degenerated to an area of low-pressure in the vicinity of Piagapo in Lanao del Sur, thus lifting all warning signals on Mindanao and issuing their final advisory. On May 14, the system dissipated over the Sulu Sea, and both the JMA and the JTWC issued their final advisories on the storm.

In preparations for the storm, the local government of Davao Occidental raised a blue alert on May 13, with the authorities in the area preparing rescue equipment in case of emergency. The PAGASA also warned small vessels near the area to stay away from the rough seas caused by the storm. Schools were ordered to be suspended from that day in Davao Occidental, including the submission of modules. When Crising made landfall, it caused widespread rains and flooding across Mindanao and Southern Visayas. Gusty winds were also felt in parts of Mindanao where the storm passed. In Baganga, some trees were knocked down by strong winds, while strong winds with heavy rainfall were reported in Cateel and Boston, all in the province. Three men and a carabao were required to be rescued from the rising Kabacan River in the early hours of May 14; they were successfully released safely from the said river. An evacuation center in South Upi, Maguindanao were reported to be flooded and some crops near the center were submerged in floodwaters, all due to a rising river near the area. Agricultural damages were estimated at ₱23.2 million (US$486,000).

Tropical Storm Choi-wan (Dante)

The area's nearby environment exhibited low wind shear and warm sea surface temperatures, which were ideal conditions for tropical cyclogenesis. The JMA assessed the area to have developed into a tropical depression on May 29 at 06:00 UTC. The PAGASA made a similar assessment in a Tropical Cyclone Advisory issued at 15:00 UTC. The JTWC later followed with their own assessment, identifying the center of the newly developed tropical depression and assigning the designation 04W. As the system tracked westward, it entered the Philippine Area of Responsibility at 01:00 PHT (17:00 UTC). The PAGASA then named the storm Dante in its first Tropical Cyclone Bulletin for the storm. Dante further organized in the Philippine Sea, and on May 30 at 15:00 UTC, the JTWC upgraded it to a tropical storm, with the PAGASA doing the same at 21:00 UTC. On the next day at 00:00 UTC, the JMA also upgraded Dante into a tropical storm, giving it the international name Choi-wan. Choi-wan's center was exposed due to a tropical upper tropospheric trough from the northeast, inducing shear on the system. On June 1 at 12:30 UTC, Choi-wan made landfall on Sulat, Eastern Samar as a minimal tropical storm, with the JTWC downgrading it to a tropical depression at 15:00 UTC. It made a second landfall on Cataingan at 17:00 UTC. Choi-wan made several more landfalls on the Philippines, making its third landfall on Balud, Masbate at 19:30 UTC. It made a fourth landfall on Romblon, Romblon on June 2 at 00:00 UTC, a fifth on San Agustin, Romblon at 00:50 UTC, a sixth on Pola, Oriental Mindoro at 06:00 UTC, a seventh on Tingloy, Batangas at 11:20 UTC, and an eighth and final landfall on the Calatagan Peninsula before moving into the South China Sea. On June 3 at 03:00 UTC, the JTWC upgraded Choi-wan back to a tropical storm. At 03:00 UTC, the PAGASA removed all Tropical Cyclone Warning Signals as Choi-wan moved away from the country. Choi-wan then exited the PAR on June 3 at 18:00 UTC before weakening into a tropical depression on the next day at 06:00 UTC and re-entering the PAR at 08:00 UTC. Then, it passed southeast of the island of Taiwan before moving out near the Okinawa Prefecture and heading towards Japan. On June 5 at 06:00 UTC, the Japan Meteorological Agency issued their final advisory on the system. 3 hours later at 09:00 UTC, the JTWC upgraded Choi-wan back into a tropical storm, however at 15:00 UTC, the Joint Typhoon Warning Center downgraded the system to a tropical depression, also issuing their final advisory on the system.

Heavy rains caused floods in parts of Mindanao; 11 fatalities were reported, 3 people were injured, and 2 people are missing. As of June 4, 55,226 people were affected and 16,680 people are inside evacuation centers. A total of ₱307.2 million (US$6.39 million) of damages were incurred throughout the country, of which ₱152.1 million (US$3.17 million) was agricultural damages and ₱155.1 million (US$3.23 million) was related to infrastructure. On June 1, classes and government work for parts of Davao de Oro, Eastern Samar, Leyte, and Surigao del Sur were suspended for the day.

Tropical Storm Koguma 

Tracking west-northwestward, the storm was located in a favorable environment for further development, with warm sea surface temperatures and low wind shear. At 00:00 UTC on June 11, the JMA upgraded the system into a tropical depression. Six hours later, the JTWC issued a TCFA for the system as it began to show characteristics of a monsoon depression. By 18:00 UTC, the JMA upgraded the system to a tropical storm, assigning it the name Koguma. On June 12 at 00:00 UTC, the JTWC upgraded Koguma to a tropical depression, assigning it the designation 05W. Later that day, the JTWC also upgraded Koguma to a tropical storm. By June 12, it had made landfall southeast of Hanoi, dissipating on the next day.

1 person died in Yên Bái province as a result of Koguma.

Typhoon Champi 

The system remained weak as it moved northwestwards in a favorable environment for further intensification, characterized by warm sea surface temperatures, low to moderate wind shear and good outflow; the disturbance remained weak as it moved northwestwards. The JTWC issued a TCFA on the system two days later, though the system remained disorganised. The JMA upgraded the system to a tropical depression at 00:00 UTC on June 21. Meanwhile, the JTWC designated it as 06W in their first advisory on the system, with an exposed LLCC being evident on satellite imagery due to moderate wind shear, being induced by a tropical upper tropospheric trough to its north. By 21:00 on June 21, 06W made its closest passage to the south-southwest of Guam, continuing its northwest track. On June 22, at 06:00 UTC, the JTWC upgraded the system into a tropical storm as it continued to move away from Guam. The JMA followed and upgraded the system into a tropical storm, in June 23 at 00:00 UTC, and assigned it the name Champi. At 18:00 UTC, the JMA upgraded the storm to a severe tropical storm as it turned northwestwards. At this time, a microwave imagery scan of Champi revealed an eye feature emerging in the system; however, this was short lived as dry air continued to impact the storm from the west. In addition, poleward outflow on the system remained weak on June 24, restricting Champi to significantly develop. However, on the next day, as a shortwave trough crossed the Ryukyu Islands, the outflow increased on the storm which allowed it to intensify further. On June 25, at 06:00 UTC, the JMA officially declared the storm a typhoon. The JTWC soon followed, upgrading it into a Category 1-equivalent typhoon. The storm continued to weaken as it move towards the Japanese islands, until on June 27, the JMA issued its last advisory at 12:00 UTC as the system became an extratropical low. The JTWC also issued its last warning for Champi at 09:00 UTC, same day.

In the wake of the tropical depression, the National Weather Service in Guam issued a tropical storm watch for Rota in the Northern Mariana Islands and a tropical storm warning for the whole island of Guam on June 21. Marine and flash flood warnings were also posted on the former and on Saipan, Tinian, and other islands in the east and south, while classes on an elementary and a high school in the latter were suspended on the next day due to a reported power outage. Electrical disruptions were also experienced on Chalan Pago, Toto/Canada, and Santa Rita in Guam due to the system's near approach. As it moved away from the island and the Marianas, the watch and warning on these areas were lifted at 01:00 UTC on June 22. In the Bonin Islands, residents in the area were advised of rough seas and gusty winds caused by Champi.

Tropical Depression 07W (Emong) 

On July 2, the JTWC started to monitor a tropical disturbance to the southwest of Guam. Moving northwestwards, the disturbance was located in an environment conducive for intensification in the Philippine Sea, with warm sea surface temperatures, and low wind shear, in addition to good poleward outflow, being induced by an upper-level trough to the northwest. The JMA upgraded the broad and weak system to a tropical depression at 18:00 UTC on the next day, followed by a TCFA being issued by the JTWC an hour and a half later. The PAGASA subsequently upgraded the system to a tropical depression at 02:00 UTC on July 4, naming it Emong. At 21:00 UTC, the JTWC also upgraded the system to a tropical depression, designating it as 07W. On July 6, PAGASA issued its last advisory on Tropical Depression Emong at 03:00 UTC as it moved outside the PAR and also lift up the warnings which were imposed earlier in the wake of Emong. Meanwhile, the JMA soon followed and issued its last advisory. JTWC also issued its last advisory as its convection was significantly sheared and its low level circulation dissipated rapidly over six hours.

In the Philippines, the depression's approach required the raising of Public Storm Warning Signal No. 1 in the provinces of Batanes and the northeastern portion of Cagayan, including the Babuyan Islands, starting on July 4. The Office of Civil Defense of Cagayan were also on blue alert on the next day due to the storm, with the agency conducting a pre-disaster assessment with other government bureaus that day. The residents in the coastal areas of Palanan, Divilacan, Maconacon and Dinapigue in Isabela were also warned of the storm while fishing activities in the region were prohibited due to Emong.

Tropical Depression 08W 

At 12:00 UTC on July 3, the PAGASA started to monitor a low-pressure area that developed near Torrijos, Marinduque or 149 kilometers to the south of Manila, followed by the Joint Typhoon Warning Center (JTWC)'s advisory at 01:00 UTC on the next day, citing the system's development as "low". In the latter's analysis on the disturbance, multispectral and microwave image scans on the system showed a weak low-level circulation center over the eastern part of Mindoro with flaring convection in the western periphery. Also that day at 15:00 UTC, the low-pressure area exited the Philippine Area of Responsibility (PAR), which was followed by the Japan Meteorological Agency (JMA) upgrading the storm to a tropical depression roughly three hours later. Eventually, the JTWC upgraded the system's potential intensification trend to "high" and subsequently issued a Tropical Cyclone Formation Alert at 00:30 UTC on June 6 as a circulation became well-defined. It then changed its motion towards the west along the periphery of a subtropical ridge on the north and northwest as it approached the Hainan Island. By 06:00 UTC on the next day, the disturbance moved inland on the region near Lingshui Li Autonomous County before emerging on the Gulf of Tonkin, in an area of low to moderate wind shear. Later, the disturbance began to reorganize; however, strong wind gradient suppressed its intensification, with flaring convection displaced to the west. Nine hours later, the JTWC upgraded the system to a weak tropical depression with maximum sustained winds of 45 km/h (30 mph); the JMA analysed the storm to be at 55 km/h (35 mph) and a minimum barometric pressure of 1000 hPa (29.53 inHg). By the night of that day, the depression, with the identifier 08W from the JTWC made landfall on Thanh Hoa, Vietnam on that intensity, before subsequently issuing their final warning as the agency confirmed that the system dissipated inland, with the evidences of radar and satellite imagery. The JMA continued to monitor the system until it dissipated at 00:00 UTC on July 8 over Laos.

PAGASA issued rainfall advisories on July 6 as the depression's precursor low tracked near the Philippines. The China Meteorological Administration (CMA), Hong Kong Observatory (HKO), and Macao Meteorological and Geophysical Bureau (SMG) issued tropical cyclone warnings on July 7. The warnings imposed by the HKO and SMG were later lifted at 06:10 UTC (14:10 HKT) as the system moved away from Hong Kong and Macao. As the depression approached Vietnam, the Vietnamese Ministry of Defense readied 264,272 soldiers and 1,979 vehicles for potential emergencies. Aquaculture activities were also temporarily banned. Rough seas and flooding were experienced in Thanh Hóa's Hoằng Hóa District. About  of rice crops and a water pipeline in Minh Luong commune, Van Ban district were both inundated and washed away by floods in Lào Cai.

Typhoon In-fa (Fabian)

At 06:00 UTC on July 14, the JTWC started to monitor an area of low pressure west-northwest of Guam. Located in an area favorable for intensification with warm sea surface temperatures as its outflow improved, the system struggled to develop under moderate wind shear before gradually intensifying, with the agency issuing a Tropical Cyclone Formation Alert at 20:30 UTC on the next day. On July 16, the PAGASA upgraded the disturbance to a tropical depression as it entered the Philippine Area of Responsibility, assigning it the local name Fabian. The JMA later recognized the system as a tropical depression at 03:00 UTC on the same day, with the JTWC doing the same at 09:00 UTC, designating it as 09W. On July 18 at 00:00 UTC, the JMA upgraded it to a tropical storm assigning it the name In-fa. The JTWC also upgraded it to a tropical storm at 03:00 UTC. The system had deep flaring convection, however its low-level circulation was broad and elongated. On July 18, at 00:00 UTC, the JMA upgraded the system to a severe tropical storm. In-fa started moving westwards, and as it gradually strengthened, In-fa developed a formative eye on July 20, at 03:00 UTC. At 09:00 UTC, the JTWC declared In-fa to have strengthened into a typhoon as it had deep convection and robust outflow. The JMA also followed suit and upgraded In-fa to a typhoon at 12:00 UTC because of good upper-level outflow and higher sea surface temperatures; however, its central dense overcast was still obscure. On the next day at 03:00 UTC, In-fa strengthened into a Category 2-equivalent typhoon as its central convection continued to deepen. The feeder bands became more compact and the eye of the typhoon became clearer and more defined. Because of dry air, the JTWC later downgraded In-fa to a Category 1-equivalent typhoon at 03:00 UTC the next day despite the presence of warm sea surface temperatures and low wind shear. On July 23 at 21:00 UTC, In-fa got further downgraded to a tropical storm by the JTWC, as its eyewall became fragmented and the deep convection was not continuous over the eye; it later re-intensified into a Category 1-equivalent typhoon again at 03:00 UTC the next day as it regained convective depths and it managed to maintain a ragged eye. At 09:00 UTC, PAGASA issued its final advisory as Typhoon In-fa moved northwards and exited the PAR. On the next day, the China Meteorological Administration (CMA) noted In-fa to have made landfall in Putuo Island at around 04:30 UTC. After making landfall, the JTWC downgraded it to a tropical storm at 09:00 UTC as it eye structure began to degrade. JMA later downgraded to a severe tropical storm at 12:00 UTC, because of influence of land and involvement of dry air.

In Okinawa Prefecture, rough waves impacted coastal areas. Rains began to pound Minamidaitō and Kitadaitōjima on July 19. This was enough to down power lines, which affected 860 people in the main island of Okinawa and the villages of Iheya and Izena. In Mainland China, record-breaking rainfall was reported, which caused flooding in the province of Henan. These devastating floods brought the death toll of the 2021 Henan floods to 99. This was caused because of the moisture associated with Cempaka and In-fa, despite being far away. The CMA issued a blue warning over the Fujian coast and north Zhejiang. CMA later upgraded the warning to an orange warning as In-fa moved closer to China. After making landfall, CMA downgraded its warning to a yellow warning as the threat of the typhoon lessened. In Taiwan, the Central Weather Bureau issued a heavy rainfall warning for Kaohsiung, Pingtung County and Hengchun Peninsula and a sea warning for the northern and eastern coasts of the country as In-fa's periphery nears, however it was cancelled at 02:05 UTC (10:05 TST). In the Philippines, In-fa strengthened the annual monsoon, causing heavy rainfall mainly in Luzon. Heavy rainfall and flooding have been reported in some areas. As the typhoon moved southwest towards the Philippine Sea, PAGASA raised a Signal No. 1 warning for the province of Batanes and the Babuyan Islands in preparation of strong winds and heavy rainfall. The warnings were later lifted as it exited the PAR.

Typhoon Cempaka 

On July 17, the JMA reported that a tropical depression had formed. The JTWC later issued a TCFA for the system, as the aforementioned area of convection became more organized. By the next day, the JTWC upgraded the system to a tropical depression and designated it as 10W, with the storm possessing an improved convective structure and a defined low-level circulation. The JTWC upgraded the system to a tropical storm at 21:00 UTC as it had a defined low-level circulation center with improved banding structure. At 00:00 UTC on July 19, the JMA upgraded the system to a tropical storm, assigning it the name Cempaka. The JMA later upgraded it to a severe tropical storm at 00:00 UTC on the next day. Cempaka made landfall near Jiangcheng District, Yangjiang, Guangdong Province, and the JTWC downgraded it to a tropical storm at 18:00 UTC the same day as its low-level circulation center became obscure. The JMA also downgraded Cempaka to a tropical storm at 00:00 UTC the next day as it moved further inland and its central dense overcast disappeared. At 09:00 UTC, the JTWC further downgraded Cempaka to a tropical depression as its deep convection declined; however, it still retained a well-defined wind field. After moving inland, Cempaka started moving westward at 00:00 UTC on July 21 due to weak steering flow. Remaining inland, Cempaka maintained tropical storm intensity as it continued westward, but due to unfavorable conditions over land, it weakened into a tropical depression on the next day at 00:00 UTC. On July 22, at 09:00 UTC, Cempaka then moved southwards towards the Gulf of Tonkin because of the influence of the monsoonal westerlies, while maintaining its tropical depression intensity inland. Cempaka moved southward, crossed Móng Cái, Quảng Ninh Province in Vietnam and later entered the Gulf of Tonkin at 03:00 UTC. However, Cempaka further weakened despite the presence of warm sea surface temperatures because of high monsoonal wind shear and land interaction. At 15:00 UTC, the JTWC issued its final warning on the system as it became a weakly defined system with an exposed low-level circulation center over Bạch Long Vĩ Island. On July 26 at 00:00 UTC, the JMA issued its last advisory.

In preparation for the tropical depression, the HKO issued a Signal No. 1 warning for Hong Kong at 13:40 UTC on July 18, which was later upgraded to a Signal No. 3 warning as Cempaka neared the Pearl River Delta. However, as it moved away from Hong Kong, the HKO downgraded it to a Signal No. 1 warning, which was later cancelled at 11:40 UTC. The CMA issued an orange alert for the southern provinces of China as Cempaka moved closer to Guangdong, China, though it was later downgraded to a blue alert as it entered the Chinese mainland. It was later lifted by the CMA, as the threat of Cempaka was minimal. As Cempaka made landfall in Guangdong, there were reports of heavy rainfall and rough waves in the region. Over 990 flights were cancelled in Guangzhou, Shenzhen and Zhuhai. The influence of Cempaka caused heavy rainfall in Henan Province, along with In-fa causing devastating floods in the region.

Tropical Storm Nepartak

A weak system, multispectral satellite imageries revealed that the disturbance was disorganized along the said trough, while advanced scaterrometer data showed another same feature with southerly convergent flow over the northern Mariana Islands. Environmental analysis depicted an unfavorable amount of wind shear, although the agency noted that the disturbance can form as a subtropical cyclone along the subtropical trough with the help of baroclinity. Tracking northeastward, the system slowly organized, with low-level circulation center developing seen on meteorological satellite imageries. The Japan Meteorological Agency (JMA) designated the disturbance as a tropical depression, seventeen hours later while the JTWC upgraded the system's potential intensification trend from "medium" to "high" and subsequently issued a Tropical Cyclone Formation Alert (TCFA) on the storm at 22:30 UTC that day. At 12:00 UTC, Dvorak intensity observations and surface wind data from satellite scatterometer confirmed that the depression further intensified to the eighth tropical storm of the season, whereupon the JMA named it as Nepartak. The JTWC, however only issued its first warning on Nepartak as Tropical Depression 11W, three hours later as its LLCC further became broad and exposed with its center remaining weakly defined while being steered on the continued direction by a north–south oriented subtropical ridge. Another nine hours later, the agency further upgraded the system to a subtropical storm as vigorous deep convection further became constant on the east of the still-exposed and elongated circulation center. By July 24, Nepartak was guided north-northeastwards by an upper-level low and a trough. Baroclinic interaction with the latter also led to the development of a large and asymmetric wind field, with the maximum sustained winds of  being far from the center. Later, the system's core became ragged as it turned northwards and further northeast before shifting north again while remaining at that intensity. At 09:00 UTC of the next day, the JTWC noted two distinct vorticities, being spaced  to each other, with each having an elongated circulation from the south-southwest to the north-northeast.

At that time, the storm was now almost centered underneath an upper-level low, in which it interacted with for several days prior. As it turned towards the north, the system started to approach the Tōhoku region, and its circulation center became well-defined while located under the cold-core low, which was causing dry air intrusions within the cyclone. The system began to weaken to a low-end tropical storm before making landfall near the town of Minamisanriku in Miyagi Prefecture at 23:00 UTC as a subtropical depression. As it rapidly crossed far western Honshu, its LLC became disorganized and ragged, with its convective signature collapsing as it crossed the Japanese Alps. At 15:00 UTC on July 28, the JTWC issued its final warning and bulletin on the system as it emerged over the Sea of Japan. Meanwhile, the JMA continued to monitor the remaining remnants on the area until it dissipated at 12:00 UTC on July 31.

The system was the first tropical cyclone to make landfall in any part of Miyagi Prefecture since reliable records began in 1951. As Nepartak was anticipated to bring bad weather in the midst of the 2020 Summer Olympics, the rowing competitions were rescheduled.

Tropical Depression 12W 

On August 1, the JTWC issued a TCFA for a disturbance in the open western Pacific as it had an ill-defined low-level circulation center and deep convection. On the next day, at 00:00 UTC, the JMA recognized it as a tropical depression as it was located near Minami-Tori-shima. A few hours later, the JTWC upgraded the system to a tropical depression, giving it the designation 12W. At that time, the LLC of the storm remained exposed and its strongest convection or thunderstorms were displaced to the west. A deep-layered subtropical ridge to the east guided the depression to move to the north-northwest while being near from a monsoon gyre. Despite being located in a favorable environment for additional strengthening, another system to the south slowly interacted with the depression, which weakened the storm's intensity. By August 3, the JTWC downgraded 12W to a disturbance as its structure deteriorated; the agency upgraded it back to a tropical depression a day later. The system's LLC then became fully exposed, and on August 6, both the JTWC and the JMA assessed that 12W had dissipated.

Tropical Storm Lupit (Huaning) 

On August 2, the JMA noted a tropical depression near Zhanjiang had formed. Soon afterwards, the JTWC issued a TCFA on the disturbance situated approximately 153 nm west-southwest of Hong Kong. On the same day at 21:00 UTC, the JTWC assessed the system as a tropical depression and accordingly designated it as 13W. Twenty four hours later, the agency upgraded the system to a tropical storm. On August 4 at 12:00 UTC, the JMA followed suit and designated the system as a tropical storm, assigning it the name Lupit. A day later at 03:20 UTC, it made landfall over Nan'ao County in Shantou, Guangdong Province. At 08:50 UTC, it made another landfall over Dongshan County in Zhangzhou, Fujian Province. On August 7, it headed eastward and briefly entered the PAR, and was named Huaning by PAGASA. On August 9, at 00:00 UTC, the JMA issued its final warning, as it completed its extratropical transition. At 21:00 UTC, the JTWC followed and issued its final warning.

Severe Tropical Storm Mirinae (Gorio) 

On August 3, at 18:00 UTC, the JMA issued a tropical cyclone advisory for a tropical depression which was located off the east coast of Taiwan and north of the Philippines. The JMA later issued its first prognostic reasoning at the same time, stating that clusters of convective bursts were scattered around the low-level circulation. At 22:00 UTC, the same day, the JTWC issued a TCFA for the system, as it had a consolidating low-level circulation, and it was located in a very conductive environment with high sea surface temperatures and low to moderate vertical wind shear. On the next day, at 03:00 UTC, the PAGASA recognized it as a tropical depression and named it Gorio, as it was located inside the PAR. At 06:00 UTC, the JTWC did the same and designated it as 14W, as satellite imagery showed a fully exposed mesovortex. On August 5, at 06:00 UTC, the JMA upgraded it to a tropical storm, naming it as Mirinae. Clusters of convective bursts were gathering around the center with a curved manner, with Mirinae having distinct anticyclonic outflow. At 15:00 UTC, the JTWC followed and upgraded it to a tropical storm, as the storm developed a partially exposed low-level circulation center. Flaring convection was present, though it was affected by moderate westerly wind shear. On August 9, at 09:00 UTC, the JTWC issued its final warning for the system. The JMA later issued its last warning on the next day at 00:00 UTC, as it became an extratropical cyclone.

Severe Tropical Storm Nida 

At 03:00 UTC, the next day, the JTWC issued a TCFA for the system. By that time, it had developed a partially obscured low-level circulation center. At 15:00 UTC, the JTWC recognized it as a tropical depression, designating it as 15W. On August 5, 03:00 UTC, the JTWC upgraded it to a tropical storm, as its low-level circulation center became more defined. Three hours later, the JMA followed and named it Nida. Satellite imagery showed that convective bursts were organized into a curved band and that the system was exhibiting good anticyclone outflow. On August 6, at 18:00 UTC, the JMA upgraded it to a severe tropical storm, as it had distinct anticyclonic outflow. Nida then started moving eastwards at 6:00 UTC the next day, because a mid-level subtropical high-pressure area along with the westerlies. On August 7, at 09:00 UTC, the JTWC issued the last advisory for the system, as its low-level circulation center was partly exposed due to the westerlies inflicting shear upon the storm. However, the JMA continued to publish bulletins for the system. Nida continued its trajectory. On August 7, 12:00 UTC, the JMA downgraded it to a tropical storm due to shear and a generally less conductive environment. The JMA further downgraded it to an extratropical low at 00:00 UTC the next day as it completed its extratropical transition.

Tropical Storm Omais (Isang) 

Four days later, the low-pressure area crossed the International Date Line, and on August 10, at 06:00 UTC, the JMA declared it as a tropical depression as it was located northeast of Ratak. By 13:00 UTC, the JTWC issued a TCFA for the system as satellite imagery showed it had developed a well-defined low-level circulation. At 15:00 UTC, the JTWC recognized it as a tropical depression and designated it as 16W as satellite imagery depicted developing spiral bands and a defined low-level circulation center. The system briefly became a tropical storm; However, at 21:00 UTC, the JTWC downgraded it to a tropical depression as its convection struggled to organize itself. It regained its intensity at 09:00 UTC the next day as its convection became more organized. Satellite imagery also continued to indicate the presence of a well-defined low-level circulation center. It was downgraded to a tropical depression again on the next day as its low-level circulation center became less defined. On August 16, at 00:00 UTC, the JMA issued its final advisory for the system, losing its tropical cyclone characteristics because of unfavorable conditions. Later at 00:00 UTC, the next day, the JMA started tracking the system again. At 09:00 UTC, the JTWC issued its final advisory as the system's convection became further disorganized despite the presence of a marginally favorable environment. At 19:30 UTC on August 18, the JTWC issued a TCFA for its remnants as its low-level circulation center improved significantly. On August 19, the system was upgraded by PAGASA to a tropical depression, and a few hours later, it received the local name Isang as it entered the Philippine Area of Responsibility. At 15:00 UTC, the system was re-upgraded to a tropical depression by the JTWC, as its deep convection started to become more organized over the low-level center. On August 20, at 12:00 UTC, the JMA upgraded to a tropical storm, naming it as Omais. Favorable conditions like high sea-surface temperatures, high tropical cyclone heat potential, and low wind shear helped it to develop over the past few hours. The JTWC did the same thing at 21:00 UTC, the same day. At 18:00 UTC the next day, the JMA upgraded it to a severe tropical storm as satellite imagery showed convective bursts gathering around the center in a curved manner; however, shortly after at 06:00 UTC on August 22, it weakened into a tropical storm due to increasing wind shear from the westerlies. At 03:00 UTC on August 23, the JTWC downgraded it to a tropical depression as its convection was severely affected by the extremely high westerly wind shear. On August 24 at 00:00 UTC, the JMA issued its final advisory as the system became an extratropical cyclone over the Sea of Japan. Nine hours later, the JTWC followed and issued its last warning for Omais.

As the system neared the islands of Guam, the NWS issued a tropical storm watch at 22:36 UTC on August 14. At 10:00 UTC on August 15, the NWS issued a tropical storm watch for the island of Rota. However, all watches were lifted by the NWS at 09:14 UTC the next day as the system further weakened.

Tropical Depression 17W 

On September 1 on 00:00 UTC, the JMA noticed a tropical depression near Wake Island. At 06:00 UTC, the JTWC gave a medium chance of formation for the system over the same area, despite being classified as subtropical depression, as it developed a well defined, partially exposed low-level circulation center. At 20:00 UTC, the JTWC issued a TCFA for the system, and at 03:00 UTC the next day, it was upgraded to a tropical depression and was designated as 17W, as its low-level circulation center became more defined but still partially exposed. The system maintained its defined convective structure, however at 09:00 UTC on September 3, it struggled to consolidate because of presence of dry air causing its convective structure to diminish. At 21:00 UTC, the JTWC issued its final advisory as its remaining convection was sheared by the incoming westerlies. At 12:00 UTC on September 4, the JMA stopped tracking the system.

Severe Tropical Storm Conson (Jolina) 

The disturbance gradually intensified, and on September 5, the JMA recognized the system as a tropical depression. Later that day, the JTWC issued a TCFA as its low-level circulation center and its surrounding convection became well organized. The agency recognized the system as a tropical depression around four hours later. At 21:00 UTC, the PAGASA recognized the system as a tropical depression, with the agency assigning it the local name Jolina. The next day on 06:00 UTC, the JMA upgraded the system to a tropical storm, assigning it the international name Conson, with the JTWC following suit three hours later. At 12:00 UTC, the JTWC upgraded it typhoon before downgrading it into a tropical storm at 18:00 UTC. Three hours later, the JMA upgraded it to a severe tropical storm. At the same moment, Conson rapidly intensified into a typhoon according to the PAGASA as it made its first landfall on Hernani, Eastern Samar. Conson then made another landfall at 02:30 PHT (18:30 UTC) in Daram, Samar, and another one at 03:40 PHT (19:40 UTC) in Santo Niño, Samar. At 06:30 PHT (22:30 UTC), Conson made a fourth landfall in Almagro, Samar. At 00:00 UTC on September 7, the JMA downgraded it to a tropical storm as it was significantly weakened by multiple landfalls. Conson then made a fifth landfall in Dimasalang, Masbate at 11:00 PHT (03:00 UTC), later weakening into a severe tropical storm, according to PAGASA. Conson then made a sixth landfall over Torrijos, Marinduque. Conson continued to pummel through more islands, making a seventh landfall over the area in Lobo, Batangas. After making its eighth landfall at San Juan, Batangas, Conson traversed the BatangasCavite area as the PAGASA declared it to have weakened back into a tropical storm. Conson made its ninth and final landfall in the vicinity of Mariveles, Bataan. At 12:00 UTC, Conson re-intensified into a severe tropical storm, as it entered the West Philippine Sea. Three hours later, the PAGASA issued its final bulletin for Conson as it exited the PAR and accelerated westward.

As Conson moved westward, it came in contact with unfavorable conditions such as increasing vertical wind shear and land interaction with Vietnam. These conditions made Conson weaken, prompting the JMA to downgrade it to a tropical storm at 12:00 UTC on September 11 to further downgrade it to a tropical depression at 18:00 UTC the same day, with the JTWC downgrading it to a tropical depression at 03:00 UTC on September 12. It stalled off the coast of Vietnam near Quang Nam because of the confluence of three ridges. At 21:00 UTC, the JTWC issued its final advisory as it made landfall near Da Nang, Vietnam, which caused the system to weaken rapidly. Satellite imagery showed that its low-level circulation center weakened significantly and became less defined. By 18:00 UTC of September 13, the JMA stopped tracking Conson, as the agency last noted it at 12:00 UTC.

According to the NDRRMC, as of September 15, 20 people have died from the storm, with combined infrastructural and agricultural damages totalling up to ₱1.59 billion (US$31.8 million) in damages. In Vietnam, 2 people were killed by flooding. Agriculture damages on the offshore island of Lý Sơn is estimated to be about 100 billion ₫ (US$4.3 million).

Typhoon Chanthu (Kiko) 

At 06:00 UTC on September 5, the JTWC began monitoring an area of convection that had formed  from Legazpi, Philippines. At 18:00 UTC the same day, the JMA declared it as a tropical depression. Five and half hours later, the JTWC issued a TCFA as its circulation and convection had significantly improved. At 09:00 UTC the next day, the JTWC upgraded the disturbance to a tropical depression, designating it as 19W. The JTWC later upgraded it to a tropical storm as it was noted that an eye-like feature was forming. The JMA later did the same at 00:00 UTC on September 7, naming it Chanthu. At 09:30 UTC, the PAGASA reported that Chanthu entered the PAR, assigning it the name Kiko. At 12:00 UTC, the JMA upgraded it to a severe tropical storm. At the same moment, Chanthu started its rapid intensification as it quickly became a minimal typhoon. Several hours later, the typhoon reached Category 4-equivalent status, and by the next day at 09:00 UTC, it reached Category 5-equivalent intensity, developing a -wide eye which was surrounded by very compact, intense convection. After reaching its initial peak, Chanthu was downgraded to a Category 4-equivalent super typhoon as its pinhole-shaped eye started to fade. However, by September 10, Chanthu began to re-intensify as its eye began to clear up. Chanthu further intensified into a Category 5-equivalent super typhoon once again at 09:00 UTC that day. On 05:00 PHT on September 11 (21:00 UTC on September 10), the PAGASA reported that Chanthu passed to the east of the Babuyan Islands; at 08:30 PHT (00:30 UTC), Chanthu made landfall in Ivana, Batanes as the storm began to weaken slightly. On September 11, Chanthu began to weaken as it continued to move northwards with the presence of dry air. The PAGASA issued its last bulletin for Chanthu since it exited the PAR on the next day. By September 14, Chanthu was no longer a typhoon as it slowly moved south-eastwards towards Japan. Due to decreasing wind shear and marginally favorable sea surface temperatures, Chanthu strengthened enough for the JMA to re-classify it as a severe tropical storm on the next day. On September 17 on 09:00 UTC, Chanthu crossed near the town of Ikitsuki, Nagasaki in Japan. It continued to move northwards as it moved through the rugged Japanese islands, causing it to weaken significantly. This caused the JMA to downgrade it to a tropical storm three hours later. At 21:00 UTC, the JTWC downgraded it to a tropical depression, as it was also undergoing extratropical transition. On September 18, the JTWC issued its final warning for the system.

Chanthu caused devastating effects in the islands of Batanes as it was made a direct hit from the typhoon. According to the local residents it was the most ferocious storm even seen. More than 30,000 residents were affected from Region I, II, III and CAR. Four municipalities went without power and none were restored and one municipality experienced water supply outage and none were restored. There were also reports of landslide and flooding mostly from Region I and III. As of September 15, total damages from the typhoon were up to ₱37.4 million (US$748,000). On September 12, Chanthu passed east of Taiwan. This caused heavy rainfall over the island including the capital city Taipei. In China, the storm shut down both Shanghai Port, the world's largest container port, and Ningbo-Zhoushan Port, the world's largest port by cargo throughput, briefly on 12–14 September, with about 86 vessels waiting outside the ports.
There were reports of structural damage and overwhelmed drainage systems on the island. 23 flights were grounded and 48 ferry sailings were cancelled.

Typhoon Mindulle 

The system rapidly consolidated itself and formed a well-defined LLCC, and thus, the system strengthened into a tropical depression on 00:00 UTC of September 22. The JTWC did the same later that day, designating the system as 20W. At 09:00 UTC of September 23, the JTWC upgraded it to a tropical storm, as its low-level circulation center became partially exposed. The JMA did the same three hours later, and named it Mindulle. At 12:00 UTC of September 24, the JMA upgraded it to a severe tropical storm. By 03:00 UTC the next day, the JTWC upgraded it to a Category 1-equivalent typhoon, as it developed a small eye. The presence of dry air had slowed its intensification, but it still managed to become a typhoon. Mindulle started to rapidly intensify as it quickly intensified into a Category 2-equivalent typhoon. Its eye expanded but became ragged due to the presence of dry air. Mindulle continued its rapid intensification, as it further intensified into a Category 4-equivalent typhoon at 15:00 UTC. Its eye became well-defined and at 03:00 UTC the next day, it became a Category 5-equivalent super typhoon, making it the third super typhoon of this season. Satellite imagery showed that the typhoon had developed a well defined  eye and deepening of the central core. At 15:00 UTC, Mindulle weakened into a Category 4-equivalent super typhoon as the eye and the convective structure started to degrade. It also underwent an eyewall replacement cycle, as it developed another eyewall. At 03:00 UTC of September 27, the JTWC further downgraded the system to a Category 3-equivalent typhoon, and six hours later, the agency had further downgraded it to a Category 2-equivalent typhoon because of the effects of the eyewall replacement cycle and the increasing presence of dry air. At 15:00 UTC of September 28, Mindulle re-intensified into a Category 3-equivalent typhoon, as it moved over favorable conditions. Satellite imagery showed that the typhoon continued to struggle to intensify. Its  eye had steadily shrunk but it remained cloud covered and ragged. By the next day at 03:00 UTC, the JTWC re-upgraded it to a Category 4-equivalent typhoon as the eye cleared out again. At 21:00 UTC of September 29, it rapidly weakened and by 15:00 UTC the next day, it weakened from a Category 3-equivalent typhoon to a Category 1-equivalent typhoon. Cool dry air and cool sea-surface temperatures were responsible for the weakening. At 21:00 UTC of October 1, the JTWC issued its final warning as it downgraded to a tropical storm. Three hours later, JMA also issued its final warning, as it became extratropical cyclone, off the coast of Hokkaido.

Tropical Storm Dianmu 

On September 21 at 18:00 UTC, the JMA noted a westward-moving low-pressure area over the South China Sea near the Philippines. Three hours later, the JTWC recognized this system. By 15:00 UTC the next day, the JTWC upgraded it to a tropical depression without issuing a TCFA for the system, as it rapidly improved its convective structure and developed a low-level circulation center; the JMA did the same three hours later. On September 23 at 06:00 UTC, the JMA upgraded it to a tropical storm and named it as Dianmu as it continued to move westward and come closer to the Vietnamese coastline. The JTWC did the same thing, three hours later. At 15:00 UTC, the JTWC issued its last warning on the system as it made landfall near Da Nang, Vietnam, with its low-level circulation center being hampered following landfall. At 06:00 UTC on September 24, the JMA downgraded it to a tropical depression as it moved further inland.

Dianmu caused a total of 8 deaths, of which 6 occurred in Thailand and 2 occurred in Vietnam.

Tropical Storm Lionrock (Lannie) 

However, the JTWC cancelled the TCFA as it crossed the Visayas region. Despite this, the PAGASA had already classified the system as a tropical depression and named it Lannie, on October 3. Lannie made its first landfall on Bucas Grande Island at 04:30 PHT (October 3, 20:00 UTC). It then made an additional seven landfalls: ones in Cagdianao in the Dinagat Islands, Liloan and Padre Burgos in Southern Leyte, Mahanay Island and Getafe in Bohol, San Fernando in Cebu, Guihulngan in Negros Oriental, and its last two landfalls at Iloc Island and El Nido, Palawan. At 14:30 UTC of October 4, the JTWC re-issued a TCFA for the system, as it moved over the South China Sea. At 06:00 UTC of October 5, the JMA recognized it as a tropical depression. At 11:00 PHT (03:00 UTC) of October 6, the PAGASA issued its final warning. At 09:00 UTC of the next day, the JTWC upgraded from a monsoonal depression to a tropical depression. It was designated as 22W. Satellite imagery found that the LLCC had become exposed but still had a defined warm core. The system's center was also ragged. At 18:00 UTC, the JMA upgraded it to a tropical storm and named it Lionrock. Nine hours later, the JTWC did the same as the convection developed a curved pattern. Lionrock continued  its trajectory, and between 09:00 UTC and 15:00 UTC of October 8, it made its first landfall over the island of Hainan. After making landfall, it briefly intensified a bit before weakening to its original intensity at 21:00 UTC. At 09:00 UTC of the next day, it crossed the island completely and entered the Gulf of Tonkin. On October 10, at 09:00 UTC, the JTWC downgraded it to a tropical depression and issued its last warning, as it made landfall near Cat Bi International Airport and its convection became disorganized over land. The JMA also downgraded it to a tropical depression at 06:00 UTC the same day, but continued to monitor it. The JMA last noted at 18:00 UTC of October 10.

In its early stages of formation, the system passed through the central Philippines. As of October 7, the NDRRMC recorded three deaths and estimated agricultural damages were topped at ₱12.2 million (US$241,000).

Severe Tropical Storm Kompasu (Maring) 

On October 6 of 18:00 UTC, the JMA noted that a low-pressure area had formed that was embedded in a large monsoonal circulation to the north of Palau. The system developed into a tropical depression at 00:00 UTC of the next day. At 09:00 UTC (17:00 PHT), the PAGASA issued its first bulletin for the first tropical depression and assigned it the name Maring. The JMA also noted the persistence of another, nearby tropical depression to its northeast, later named Nando. As it is embedded in the same monsoonal depression and due to its proximity, Nando began to merge with Maring, and therefore formed a rather broad and large circulation. This prompted the JMA to upgrade the overall system to a tropical storm, and was named Kompasu. However at that time, the JTWC still considered the system as two separate disturbances and issued separate TCFAs later in the day for both depressions, albeit noting the possibility of merging. The JTWC later considered the entire system as merged with their first warning for Kompasu. At midnight of October 11, the JMA upgraded it to a severe tropical storm, as it attained good cloud characteristics. At 12:10 UTC (20:10 PHT), Kompasu made its first landfall near Fuga Island of Cagayan Province. At 05:00 PHT of October 13 (21:00 UTC of October 12), the PAGASA issued its final bulletin as its exited the PAR and continued towards Hainan. Between 03:00 and 09:00 UTC of October 13, Kompasu had made landfall over the east coast of Hainan. By 18:00 UTC, the JMA downgraded it to a tropical storm, as it crossed the entire island and entered the Gulf of Tonkin, as its convection had rapidly weakened because of the rough terrain of the island. At 09:00 UTC of the next day, the JTWC issued its final warning followed by downgrading to a tropical depression, as its convection had diminished and the low-level circulation center had been weakened significantly because of the increasing vertical wind shear and dry air, despite not making landfall over northern Vietnam. The JMA issued its final warning after downgrading it to a tropical depression at 18:00 UTC.

As of October 31, the NDRRMC has confirmed a total of 43 deaths, along with 16 people still missing. Total estimated damages of both infrastructure and agriculture is topped to ₱6.39 billion (US$126.5 million). In Hong Kong, one person was killed and 21 people were injured.

Tropical Depression Nando 

On 00:00 UTC of October 7, the JMA began monitoring on a tropical depression that had developed to the north of Palau, that was embedded in the same monsoonal circulation as Tropical Depression Maring. As the circulation moved inside the Philippine Area of Responsibility, the PAGASA began issuing advisories and assigned the local name Nando to the depression. By the next day, the JMA stopped tracking the system after it began to merge with Maring, which subsequently became Tropical Storm Kompasu. The PAGASA issued its final bulletin on the system on October 9. The JTWC issued separate TCFAs for two invests in the monsoonal depression that contained Maring and Nando — Invests 93W and 94W, respectively. As the two merged, the JTWC cancelled the TCFA for Invest 93W and soon began issuing a single tropical cyclone warning for the overall system.

Severe Tropical Storm Namtheun 

The JMA later recognized the same area of convection as a tropical depression on October 9. At 14:00 UTC the same day, the JTWC issued a TCFA for the invest as it developed a flaring convection which was circulating over the obscured LLCC. By midnight of the next day, the JMA upgraded it to a tropical storm and named it Namtheun. The JTWC recognized it as a tropical depression, three hours later, and six hours later, the JTWC upgraded it to a tropical storm. Namtheun managed to maintain its intensity for two days, until at 09:00 UTC of October 13, it was downgraded to a tropical depression by the JTWC, as it started moving westwards because of the presence of a subtropical ridge towards the southeast of the system. Satellite imagery showed that the deep convection had been displaced towards the northeast and the LLCC of the system had become less defined. However at 15:00 UTC of the next day, the JTWC re-upgraded it to a tropical storm, as it entered over warm sea-surface temperatures which allowed the system to maintain its intensity despite high wind shear. Satellite imagery also indicated that it developed subtropical characteristics. Unexpectedly, Namtheun further intensified into a severe tropical storm according to JMA at 06:00 UTC of October 16, and a Category 1-equivalent typhoon according to JTWC at 09:00 UTC of October 16. Satellite imagery depicted that the system had developed a compact core with improved convection structure near its center. It also developed an eye-like feature. The weakening of the vertical wind shear was main reason for the intensification and also the presence of marginally favorable sea-surface temperatures. A few hours later, both JMA and JTWC downgraded to a tropical storm, as its convection had weakened significantly because of further cooling of sea-surface temperatures and strengthening of the wind shear. Namtheun managed its intensity as it continued north-northwards but since it was interacting with the baroclinic zone, it started its extratropical transition between 00:00 and 15:00 UTC. Afterward, the system curved northward and then north-northwestward, while gradually weakening, before being absorbed into another approaching extratropical cyclone from the west, late on October 22. Namtheun's extratropical remnant brought heavy rain and powerful winds to the Pacific Northwest.

Typhoon Malou 

Infrared satellite imagery found that it formed a flaring convection which was displaced to the northwest from the actual center, but at 06:00 UTC the next day, the JTWC discontinued giving advisories to the area of convection, as its convection had completely dissipated. On the same day at 18:00 UTC, the JMA recognized the same area of convection, as a low pressure area. At 15:00 UTC of October 22, the JTWC started giving advisories for the area of convection as it developed sufficient convection and a poorly defined low-level circulation. On the next day at 18:00 UTC, the JMA upgraded it to a tropical depression, and three and a half hour later, the JTWC issued a TCFA. At 03:00 UTC of October 24, the JTWC upgraded to a tropical depression and designated as 25W. Later at 18:00 UTC, the JTWC upgraded it to a tropical storm, as the organization of the convection had increased. Six hours later, the JMA did the same thing and named it Malou. At midday of the next day, the JMA upgraded it to a severe tropical storm. Early on October 27, the JTWC upgraded it to a Category 1-equivalent typhoon, as it developed an eye-like feature wrapped around a ragged spiral bandings. At 18:00 UTC the same day, the JMA upgraded it to a typhoon.

Tropical Depression 26W 

At 00:00 UTC of October 22, the JMA noted the formation of a low-pressure area east of Mindanao. Two days later at 06:00 UTC, the JMA upgraded it to a tropical depression as it was located off the coast of the island of Palawan. On the same day, the JTWC noted the same low pressure area and gave a low chance of formation, which was later upgraded to medium. At 05:30 UTC of October 25, the JTWC issued a TCFA for the system, as its convection had improved and developed a weakly defined LLCC. On the next day, after re-issuing the TCFA at 05:00 UTC, the JTWC upgraded it to a tropical depression at 09:00 UTC as it was located off the coast of Vietnam. Satellite imagery found that its LLCC had become defined however the convective structure continued to remain disorganized. Between 15:00 UTC of October 26 and 03:00 UTC of October 27, the system made landfall near Nha Trang and at 03:00 UTC, the JTWC issued its final advisory as its convection had rapidly disorganized after landfall, as it moved over the mountainous terrain of Vietnam.

Over 50,000 sea vehicles with over 261,000 people in it were already informed on the brewing system and its path, according to a meeting about the depression on October 25. Over 3,200 officer soldiers and 270 public vehicles were also put on standby. The areas between Thừa Thiên Huế and Khánh Hòa received heavy rainfall from the system.

Typhoon Nyatoh 

On the next day, the JMA recognized the same system as a low pressure area. At 06:00 UTC of November 28, the JTWC issued a TCFA as it developed a poorly defined center, and by midnight of November 28, the JMA upgraded the system to a tropical depression. The JTWC followed suit and designated it as 27W at 15:00 UTC the same day. Six hours later, the JTWC further upgraded it to a tropical storm. At midnight of the next day, the JMA followed suit and named it as Nyatoh. On 00:00 UTC of December 1, the JMA further upgraded it to a severe tropical storm. Fifteen hours later, the JTWC declared it a typhoon and upgraded it to a Category 1-equivalent status, as Nyatoh developed an eye according to microwave imagery. The JMA followed suit at 18:00 UTC. By 03:00 UTC the next day, it further intensified into a Category 2-equivalent typhoon as it briefly formed a ragged eye. Later that day, Nyatoh unexpectedly rapidly intensified to a Category 4-equivalent super typhoon due to jet interaction. However, this peak was short-lived as strong wind shear, dry air, and cooler sea surface temperatures shredded the system apart and rapidly weakened to a Category 1-equivalent typhoon at 18:00 UTC. On December 4 at 06:35 UTC, JMA declared Nyatoh a remnant low.

Typhoon Rai (Odette) 

At 00:00 UTC of December 12, the JMA noted the existence of a tropical depression in the vicinity of the Caroline Islands. Two hours later, the JTWC issued a TCFA for the developing system, noting a "promising" environment for further development. On the next day, the JMA upgraded the system into a tropical storm and gave it the international name, Rai.

The PAGASA issued its first tropical cyclone advisory for the developing storm on December 12. Warnings for Palau and the Federated States of Micronesia were issued by the Guam National Weather Service by December 13. On the next day, Rai continued intensifying, and the Japan Meteorological Agency upgraded it to a severe tropical storm.

Rai then entered the Philippine Area of Responsibility on December 14 and was given the name Odette by the PAGASA. The PAGASA raised Tropical Cyclone Wind Signal #1 over parts of Eastern Visayas and Northern Mindanao. Later that same day, the JMA upgraded Rai to a typhoon. The PAGASA and the JTWC later followed suit and also upgraded Rai to a typhoon. Rai then rapidly intensified overnight, becoming a Category 5-equivalent super typhoon on the morning of December 16.

Rai then made its first landfall on General Luna, Surigao del Norte at 1:30PM PHT. A few minutes later, it struck Cagdianao, Dinagat Island. It then made a third landfall in Liloan, Southern Leyte. It continued to cross the islands and later struck Padre Burgos, Southern Leyte and President Carlos P. Garcia, Bohol. It then soon struck Bien Unido, Bohol. It lost super typhoon intensity and then struck Carcar, Cebu. It made an eighth landfall on La Libertad, Negros Oriental. It made a final landfall in Roxas, Palawan. 
The system then left the PAR by 12:40 PHT (04:40 UTC). For the first time since Typhoon Rammasun in 2014 and the third after Pamela of 1954 and the aforementioned storm, Rai unexpectedly attained Category 5-equivalent super typhoon status in the South China Sea, due to the favorable environment in that region, at 21:00 UTC on December 18, as it underwent a secondary period of rapid intensification.

By 03:00 UTC the next day, Rai again weakened below Category 5-equivalent super typhoon intensity, while turning in a west-northwesterly direction. Its eye was cloud-filled by this time, with the storm rapidly weakening afterward.

As of January 6, 2022, 410 fatalities have been reported, with 111 alone being located in Bohol. On March 23, 2022, PAGASA revised their tropical cyclone scale. Rai (Odette) was considered as a super typhoon.

Tropical Depression 29W 

On December 14, the JMA upgraded a westward-moving low-pressure area to a tropical depression. The JTWC began monitoring the system by the next day, noting the presence of a consolidated low-level circulation within the system. The system's chances of developing into a tropical cyclone slowly increased, and on December 16 at 17:30 UTC, the JTWC issued a TCFA for the system despite the outflow of Typhoon Rai partially exposing the system's low-level circulation. By 21:00 UTC, the JTWC upgraded the system to a tropical depression, assigning it the designation 29W as it continued over marginally favorable developmental conditions. Shortly after, at 23:00 UTC, the depression made landfall north of Kuantan and began to weaken, prompting the JTWC to issue its final advisory on the system by the next day. The JMA stopped monitoring the system on December 17 at 12:00 UTC.

After passing through Peninsular Malaysia, it reached the Straits of Malacca as a low-pressure system. Persistent and continuous heavy rains for more than 24 hours began on December 17, causing the worst flooding in Central Malaysia since 2014. Floods were also reported in the states of Kelantan, Terengganu, Pahang, Perak, Negeri Sembilan and Malacca.

Other systems 

During January 19, the JMA reported that a tropical depression had developed to the east of Luzon, Philippines. The precursor to the depression brought scattered showers and thunderstorms to Mindanao, Palawan, and Visayas on January 18. The JMA, however, discontinued advisories for the system on the next day. The depression also brought stormy weather to Luzon on January 20. The PAGASA warned residents of possible flash flooding and mudslides due to heavy rainfall. The system's precursor was associated with a frontal system, with its combined effects bringing heavy rainfall over much of Visayas, the Bicol Region, and Northern Mindanao, resulting in three deaths and agricultural damages of up to ₱642.5 million (US$13.2 million).

On March 9, a low-pressure area entered the Philippine Area of Responsibility, though it was not expected to develop at that time. On March 14, the low-pressure area intensified into a tropical depression over the Sulu Sea before quickly degenerating back into a low-pressure area. The system brought light to moderate rains over parts of the Philippines, with the PAGASA advising residents of the possibility of floods and landslides.

The system gradually developed as it was experiencing warm sea surface temperatures and low vertical wind shear. On the next day at 00:00 UTC, the JMA recognized the system as a tropical depression. On the same day, the JTWC cancelled the TCFA for the system as its structure degraded, with the JMA last recognizing the system as a tropical depression on June 1 at 18:00 UTC.

On June 29, an area of convection formed  from Guam with satellite imagery revealing that the system had a deep convection with a weak low level circulation. Within a favorable environments with low-to-moderate wind shear, and warm sea surface temperatures, the system gradually became more organized with a more defined low level circulation. On June 30, the JTWC issued a TCFA for the system. On July 1, animated multispectral satellite imagery indicated a very broad and ill-defined low level circulation with convection being sheared to the south-southwest of the disturbance, which prompted the JTWC to cancel the system's TCFA and downgrade its development chances within the next day to low. The JMA no longer considered it a tropical depression in their tropical disturbance summary advisories on the same day.

It lasted for two days until July 21, when it became a remnant low at 00:00 UTC.

On July 28, at 00:00 UTC, the JMA noted a tropical depression near , which was moving northwards slowly.

On July 30, at 00:00 UTC, the JMA noted a tropical depression near , which was moving northwestward slowly.

On July 31, a tropical depression formed over the open Pacific at 18:00 UTC. By August 1, at 05:30 UTC, the JTWC issued a TCFA for the system as it had an exposed low-level circulation with persistent disorganized convection. The agency canceled the alert on the next day as it had little remaining convection and it had moved over cooler waters.

On August 1, at 18:00 UTC, JMA noted a tropical depression near Taiwan.

The JMA began tracking a tropical depression that had formed to the east of Hainan on September 7. The system moved westward towards Vietnam and was last noted the next day.

On September 27 of 06:00 UTC, the JMA noted the formation of a low-pressure area located to the east of Typhoon Mindulle. The JMA later upgraded it to a tropical depression, six hours later. At 01:00 UTC the next day, the JTWC recognized the system and gave a medium chance of formation.

Storm names

Within the Northwest Pacific Ocean, both the Japan Meteorological Agency (JMA) and the Philippine Atmospheric, Geophysical and Astronomical Services Administration (PAGASA) assign names to tropical cyclones that develop in the Western Pacific, which can result in a tropical cyclone having two names. PAGASA names to tropical cyclones which move into or form as a tropical depression in their area of responsibility located between 135°E and 115°E and between 5°N and 25°N even if the cyclone has had an international name assigned to it. The names of significant tropical cyclones are retired, by both PAGASA and the Typhoon Committee. Should the list of names for the Philippine region be exhausted then names will be taken from an auxiliary list of which the first ten are published each season.

International names

During the season, 22 tropical storms developed in the Western Pacific and each one was named by the JMA, when the system was judged to have 10-minute sustained windspeeds of 65 kilometres per hour (40 mph). The JMA selected the names from a list of 140 names, that had been developed by the 14 members nations and territories of the ESCAP/WMO Typhoon Committee.  During the season, the names Surigae, Koguma, Cempaka and Nyatoh were used for the first time after they replaced Mujigae, Koppu, Melor and Meranti, which were retired following the 2015 and 2016 seasons.

Philippines

During the season, PAGASA used its own naming scheme for the 15 tropical cyclones, that either developed within or moved into their self-defined area of responsibility. The names were taken from a list of names, that was last used during 2017 and are scheduled to be used again during 2025. All of the names are the same except Uwan and Verbena which replaced the names Urduja and Vinta after they were retired.

Retirement 
After the season, on March 21, 2022, PAGASA removed the names Jolina, Maring and Odette from its rotating naming lists due to the number of deaths and amount of damage they caused, and were replaced with Jacinto, Mirasol and Opong for the 2025 season.. In March 2023, the names Conson, Kompasu and Rai were retired due to significant damage caused to the Philippines.

Season effects
This table summarizes all the systems that developed within or moved into the North Pacific Ocean, to the west of the International Date Line during 2021. The tables also provide an overview of a systems intensity, duration, land areas affected and any deaths or damages associated with the system.
|-
| TD ||  || bgcolor=#| || bgcolor=#| || bgcolor=#| || Philippines ||  ||  || 
|-
| Dujuan (Auring) ||  || bgcolor=#| || bgcolor=#||| bgcolor=#| || Palau, Philippines ||  ||  || 
|-
| TD ||  || bgcolor=#| || bgcolor=#| || bgcolor=#| || Philippines || None ||  ||
|-
| Surigae (Bising) ||  || bgcolor=#| || bgcolor=#||| bgcolor=#| || Caroline Islands, Palau, Sulawesi, Philippines ||  ||  ||
|-
| 03W (Crising) ||  || bgcolor=#| || bgcolor=#||| bgcolor=#| || Philippines ||  ||  || 
|-
| Choi-wan (Dante) ||  || bgcolor=#| || bgcolor=#||| bgcolor=#| || Palau, Philippines, Taiwan, Japan ||  || 11 ||
|-
| TD ||  || bgcolor=#| || bgcolor=#||| bgcolor=#| || None || None||  ||
|-
| Koguma ||  || bgcolor=#| || bgcolor=#||| bgcolor=#| || South China, Vietnam, Laos || || 1 ||
|-
| Champi ||  || bgcolor=#| || bgcolor=#||| bgcolor=#| || Mariana Islands || None ||  ||
|-
| TD ||  || bgcolor=#| || bgcolor=#||| bgcolor=#| || None || None ||  ||
|-
| 07W (Emong) ||  || bgcolor=#| || bgcolor=#||| bgcolor=#| || Philippines, Taiwan || None ||  ||
|-
| 08W ||  || bgcolor=#| || bgcolor=#||| bgcolor=#| || Philippines, Southern China, Vietnam || None ||  ||
|-
| In-fa (Fabian) ||  || bgcolor=#| || bgcolor=#||| bgcolor=#| || Philippines, Ryukyu Islands, Taiwan, China ||  ||  || 
|-
| Cempaka ||  || bgcolor=#| || bgcolor=#||| bgcolor=#| || South China, Vietnam ||  ||  ||
|-
| TD ||  || bgcolor=#| || bgcolor=#||| bgcolor=#| || None || None ||  ||
|-
| Nepartak ||  || bgcolor=#| || bgcolor=#||| bgcolor=#| || Japan || None ||  ||
|-
| TD ||  || bgcolor=#| || bgcolor=#||| bgcolor=#| || None || None ||  ||
|-
| TD ||  || bgcolor=#| || bgcolor=#||| bgcolor=#| || Japan || None ||  ||
|-
| TD ||  || bgcolor=#| || bgcolor=#||| bgcolor=#| || None || None ||  ||
|-
| TD ||  || bgcolor=#| || bgcolor=#||| bgcolor=#| || Ryukyu Islands, Taiwan || None ||  ||
|-
| 12W ||  || bgcolor=#| || bgcolor=#||| bgcolor=#| || Japan || None ||  ||
|-
| Lupit (Huaning) ||  || bgcolor=#| || bgcolor=#||| bgcolor=#| || Vietnam, Southern China, Taiwan, Japan ||  ||  || 
|-
| Mirinae (Gorio) ||  || bgcolor=#| || bgcolor=#||| bgcolor=#| || Japan, Western Canada || None ||  ||
|-
| Nida ||  || bgcolor=#| || bgcolor=#||| bgcolor=#| || Alaska || None ||  ||
|-
| Omais (Isang) ||  || bgcolor=#| || bgcolor=#||| bgcolor=#| || Marshall Islands, Micronesia, Mariana Islands, Ryukyu Islands, South Korea ||  $13 million ||  ||
|-
| 17W ||  || bgcolor=#| || bgcolor=#||| bgcolor=#| || None || None ||  ||
|-
| Conson (Jolina) ||  || bgcolor=#| || bgcolor=#||| bgcolor=#| || Philippines, Vietnam ||  ||  || 
|-
| Chanthu (Kiko) ||  || bgcolor=#| || bgcolor=#||| bgcolor=#| || Philippines, Taiwan, Eastern China, South Korea, Japan ||  ||  || 
|-
| TD ||  || bgcolor=#| || bgcolor=#||| bgcolor=#| || Vietnam || None ||  ||
|-
| Mindulle ||  || bgcolor=#| || bgcolor=#||| bgcolor=#| || Mariana Islands, Japan, Russian Far East || Minimal ||  ||
|-
| Dianmu ||  || bgcolor=#| || bgcolor=#||| bgcolor=#| || Vietnam, Laos, Cambodia || Unknown ||  || 
|-
| TD ||  || bgcolor=#| || bgcolor=#||| bgcolor=#| || None || None ||  ||
|-
| Lionrock (Lannie) ||  || bgcolor=#| || bgcolor=#||| bgcolor=#| || Philippines, Southern China, Vietnam|| || || 
|-
| Kompasu (Maring) ||  || bgcolor=#| || bgcolor=#||| bgcolor=#| || Philippines, Taiwan, South China, Vietnam || ||  || 
|-
| Nando ||  || bgcolor=#| || bgcolor=#||| bgcolor=#| || None || None ||  ||
|-
| Namtheun ||  || bgcolor=#| || bgcolor=#||| bgcolor=#| || Pacific Northwest, Alaska || None ||  ||
|-
| Malou ||  || bgcolor=#| || bgcolor=#||| bgcolor=#| || Bonin Islands || None ||  ||
|-
| 26W ||  || bgcolor=#| || bgcolor=#||| bgcolor=#| || Philippines, Vietnam || None ||  ||
|-
| Nyatoh  ||  || bgcolor=#| || bgcolor=#||| bgcolor=#| || Bonin Islands || None ||  ||
|-
| Rai (Odette) ||  || bgcolor=#| || bgcolor=#||| bgcolor=#| || Caroline Islands, Palau, Indonesia, Philippines, Vietnam, Southern China ||  ||  || 
|-
| 29W ||  || bgcolor=#| || bgcolor=#||| bgcolor=#| || Malaysia ||  ||  || 
|-

See also

 Weather of 2021
 Tropical cyclones in 2021
 Pacific typhoon season
 2021 Atlantic hurricane season
 2021 Pacific hurricane season
 2021 North Indian Ocean cyclone season
 South-West Indian Ocean cyclone seasons: 2020–21, 2021–22
 Australian region cyclone seasons: 2020–21, 2021–22
 South Pacific cyclone seasons: 2020–21, 2021–22

Notes

References

External links

Articles which contain graphical timelines
 
Pacific typhoon seasons
Tropical cyclones in 2021